Below is the list of populated places in Samsun Province, Turkey by the districts. The first four districts (Atakum, Canik, İlkadım, Tekkeköy) are actually parts of the city of Greater Samsun. In the following lists, the first place in each district list is the administrative center of that district.

Atakum
 Atakum
 Akalan, Atakum
 Aksu, Atakum
 Aslandamı, Atakum
 Çamlıyazı, Atakum
 Çatmaoluk, Atakum
 Elmaçukuru, Atakum
 Erikli, Atakum
 Güneyköy, Atakum
 Kabadüz, Atakum
 Kamalı, Atakum
 Karakavuk, Atakum
 Karaoyumca, Atakum
 Kayagüney, Atakum
 Kesilli, Atakum
 Köseli, Atakum
 Kulacadağ, Atakum
 Kurugökçe, Atakum
 Meyvalı, Atakum
 Özören, Atakum
 Sarayköy, Atakum
 Sarıışık, Atakum
 Sarıtaş, Atakum
 Sarıyusuf, Atakum
 Şenyurt, Atakum
 Yeşiltepe, Atakum
 Yukarıaksu, Atakum

Canik
 Canik
 Alibeyli, Canik
 Ambarpınar, Canik
 Avluca, Canik
 Başalan, Canik
 Başkonak, Canik
 Çağlayan, Canik
 Çamalan, Canik
 Demirci, Canik
 Dereler, Canik
 Devgeriş, Canik
 Düvecik, Canik
 Düzardıç, Canik
 Düzören, Canik
 Fındıcak, Canik
 Gaziköy, Canik
 Gecehan, Canik
 Gödekli, Canik
 Gökçepınar, Canik
 Gölalan, Canik
 Gültepe, Canik
 Gürgenyatak, Canik
 Hacınaipli, Canik
 Hilaltepe, Canik
 İmamlar, Canik
 Kaleboğazı, Canik
 Kaşyayla, Canik
 Kestanepınar, Canik
 Kızıloğlak, Canik
 Kozlu, Canik
 Muratlı, Canik
 Sarıbıyık, Canik
 Şirinköy, Canik
 Tekkiraz, Canik
 Teknepınar, Canik
 Toygar, Canik
 Tuzaklı, Canik
 Uluçayır, Canik
 Üçpınar, Canik
 Yayla, Canik
 Yeniköy, Canik
 Yeşilpınar, Canik

İlkadım
 İlkadım
 Akgöl, İlkadım
 Aşağıavdan, İlkadım
 Avdan, İlkadım
 Bilmece, İlkadım
 Çanakçı, İlkadım
 Çandır, İlkadım
 Çatkaya, İlkadım
 Çelikalan, İlkadım
 Çivril, İlkadım
 Gürgendağ, İlkadım
 Kapaklı, İlkadım

Tekkeköy
 Tekkeköy
 Akbaşlar, Tekkeköy
 Antyeri, Tekkeköy
 Bakacak, Tekkeköy
 Balcalı, Tekkeköy
 Başköy, Tekkeköy
 Beyoğlu, Tekkeköy
 Çayırçökek, Tekkeköy
 Çınaralan, Tekkeköy
 Çimenli, Tekkeköy
 Erenköy, Tekkeköy
 Gökçedere, Tekkeköy
 Güzelyurt, Tekkeköy
 Karaperçin, Tekkeköy
 Kargılı, Tekkeköy
 Karışlar, Tekkeköy
 Kerpiçli, Tekkeköy
 Kışla, Tekkeköy
 Kibarlar, Tekkeköy
 Sarıyurt, Tekkeköy
 Seymenler, Tekkeköy
 Sıtmasuyu, Tekkeköy
 Yağbasan, Tekkeköy
 Yaylageriş, Tekkeköy
 Yazılar, Tekkeköy
 Yenidoğan, Tekkeköy
 Yeniköy, Tekkeköy
 Yeşilalan, Tekkeköy
 Yeşildere, Tekkeköy
 Yeşilyurt, Tekkeköy
 Yukarıçinik, Tekkeköy
 Zafer, Tekkeköy

Alaçam
 Alaçam
 Akbulut, Alaçam
 Akgüney, Alaçam
 Alidedebölmesi, Alaçam
 Aşağıakgüney, Alaçam
 Aşağıısırganlı, Alaçam
 Aşağıkoçlu, Alaçam
 Bahşioymağı, Alaçam
 Demircideresi, Alaçam
 Doğankent, Alaçam
 Doyran, Alaçam
 Etyemez, Alaçam
 Göçkün, Alaçam
 Gökçeağaçoymağı, Alaçam
 Gökçeboğaz, Alaçam
 Gülkaya, Alaçam
 Gümüşova, Alaçam
 Güvenli, Alaçam
 Habilli, Alaçam
 Harmancık, Alaçam
 Kalıkdemirci, Alaçam
 Kapaklı, Alaçam
 Karaçukur, Alaçam
 Karahüseyinli, Alaçam
 Karlı, Alaçam
 Kışlakonak, Alaçam
 Kızlan, Alaçam
 Killik, Alaçam
 Köseköy, Alaçam
 Ortaköy, Alaçam
 Örenli, Alaçam
 Pelitbükü, Alaçam
 Pilitbüküsekicek, Alaçam
 Sancar, Alaçam
 Sarılık, Alaçam
 Soğukçam, Alaçam
 Şirinköy, Alaçam
 Taşkelik, Alaçam
 Tefekli, Alaçam
 Tepebölmesi, Alaçam
 Terskırık, Alaçam
 Toplu, Alaçam
 Umutlu, Alaçam
 Uzunkıraç, Alaçam
 Vicikler, Alaçam
 Yenice, Alaçam
 Yeniköy, Alaçam
 Yeşilköy, Alaçam
 Yoğunpelit, Alaçam
 Yukarıelma, Alaçam
 Yukarıısırganlı, Alaçam
 Yukarıkoçlu, Alaçam
 Yukarısoğukçam, Alaçam
 Zeytin, Alaçam

Asarcık
 Asarcık
Acısu, Asarcık
Akyazı, Asarcık
Alan, Asarcık
Alişar, Asarcık
Arıcak, Asarcık
Armutlu, Asarcık
Aşuru, Asarcık
Ayaklıalan, Asarcık
Aydınköy, Asarcık
Çulhaoğlu, Asarcık
Dağcılar, Asarcık
Emirmusa, Asarcık
Esentepe, Asarcık
Gökgöl, Asarcık
Gülveren, Asarcık
Gündoğdu, Asarcık
Hisariye, Asarcık
İmamlı, Asarcık
Kesealan, Asarcık
Kılavuzlu, Asarcık
Koşaca, Asarcık
Kuyumcuoğlu, Asarcık
Musaağa, Asarcık
Sakızlık, Asarcık
Uluköy, Asarcık
Yarımca, Asarcık
Yaylaköy, Asarcık
Yeniömerli, Asarcık
Yeşildere, Asarcık
Yeşilköy, Asarcık

Ayvacık
 Ayvacık
 Ardıç, Ayvacık
 Başalan, Ayvacık
 Çamalan, Ayvacık
 Çamlıkale, Ayvacık
 Çarşıköy, Ayvacık
 Çökekli, Ayvacık
 Döngel, Ayvacık
 Döngelyatak, Ayvacık
 Esenyurt, Ayvacık
 Eynel, Ayvacık
 Gülpınar, Ayvacık
 Gültepe, Ayvacık
 Gürçam, Ayvacık
 Güzelyurt, Ayvacık
 Kabaklık, Ayvacık
 Kapıkaya, Ayvacık
 Karaağaç, Ayvacık
 Karşıdöngel, Ayvacık
 Kazancılı, Ayvacık
 Koçyurdu, Ayvacık
 Ortaköy, Ayvacık
 Osmanlı, Ayvacık
 Örencik, Ayvacık
 Sahilköy, Ayvacık
 Söğütpınarı, Ayvacık
 Şenpınar, Ayvacık
 Terice, Ayvacık
 Tiryakioğlu, Ayvacık
 Uğurlu, Ayvacık
 Yenice, Ayvacık
 Yeniköy, Ayvacık
 Yeşilçam, Ayvacık
 Yeşildere, Ayvacık
 Yeşilpınar, Ayvacık
 Zafer, Ayvacık

Bafra
 Bafra
 Adaköy, Bafra
Ağcaalan, Bafra
 Ağıllar, Bafra
Akalan, Bafra
 Aktekke, Bafra
Alaçam, Bafra
 Altınay, Bafra
 Altınova, Bafra
Asar, Bafra
Asmaçam, Bafra
 Azay, Bafra
 Bakırpınarı, Bafra
 Balıklar, Bafra
 Barış, Bafra
Başaran, Bafra
Başkaya, Bafra
Bengü, Bafra
Boğazkaya, Bafra
Burunca, Bafra
Çalköy, Bafra
Çamaltı, Bafra
 Çatak, Bafra
 Çataltepe, Bafra
 Çetinkaya, Bafra
 Çulhakoca, Bafra
Darboğaz, Bafra
 Dededağı, Bafra
 Dedeli, Bafra
 Derbent, Bafra
Dereler, Bafra
Dikencik, Bafra
 Doğanca, Bafra
 Doğankaya, Bafra
Düzköy, Bafra
Elalan, Bafra
 Eldavut, Bafra
 Elifli, Bafra
 Emenli, Bafra
Esençay, Bafra
 Evrenuşağı, Bafra
 Eynegazi, Bafra
 Fener, Bafra
 Gazibeyli, Bafra
 Gerzeliler, Bafra
Gökalan, Bafra
 Gökçeağaç, Bafra
 Gökçekent, Bafra
 Gökçesu, Bafra
 Göltepe, Bafra
 Gümüşyaprak, Bafra
 Hacıoğlu, Bafra
 Harız, Bafra
 Hıdırellez, Bafra
 Hüseyinbeyli, Bafra
İğdir, Bafra
İkizpınar, Bafra
 İkiztepe, Bafra
 İlyaslı, Bafra
İnözükoşaca, Bafra
 Kahraman, Bafra
 Kalaycılı, Bafra
 Kamberli, Bafra
 Kanlıgüney, Bafra
Kapıkaya, Bafra
 Karaburç, Bafra
Karakütük, Bafra
 Karıncak, Bafra
 Karpuzlu, Bafra
Kasnakcımermer, Bafra
 Kaygusuz, Bafra
 Kelikler, Bafra
 Keresteci, Bafra
Kolay, Bafra
 Komşupınar, Bafra
 Koruluk, Bafra
 Koşu, Bafra
 Kozağzı, Bafra
 Köseli, Bafra
 Kuşçular, Bafra
 Kuşluğan, Bafra
Kuzalan, Bafra
 Küçükkavakpınar, Bafra
 Lengerli, Bafra
Meşelitürkmenler, Bafra
 Müstecep, Bafra
 Ortadurak, Bafra
 Osmanbeyli, Bafra
Ozan, Bafra
 Örencik, Bafra
 Paşaşeyh, Bafra
 Sahilkent, Bafra
 Sarıçevre, Bafra
 Sarıkaya, Bafra
 Sarıköy, Bafra
Sarpın, Bafra
Selemelik, Bafra
 Sürmeli, Bafra
Şahinkaya, Bafra
 Şeyhören, Bafra
 Şeyhulaş, Bafra
 Şirinköy, Bafra
 Taşköprü, Bafra
Tepebaşı, Bafra
 Tepecik, Bafra
Terzili, Bafra
 Türbe, Bafra
 Türkköyü, Bafra
 Tütüncüler, Bafra
Uluağaç, Bafra
 Üçpınar, Bafra
 Yağmurca, Bafra
 Yakıntaş, Bafra
Yenialan, Bafra
Yeniköy, Bafra
Yeraltı, Bafra
Yeşilköy, Bafra
 Yeşilyazı, Bafra
 Yiğitalan, Bafra
 Yörgüç, Bafra

Çarşamba
Çarşamba
 Acıklı, Çarşamba
 Ağcagüney, Çarşamba
 Ahubaba, Çarşamba
 Akçaltı, Çarşamba
 Akçatarla, Çarşamba
 Akkuzulu, Çarşamba
 Alibeyli, Çarşamba
 Allı, Çarşamba
 Arımköseli, Çarşamba
 Aşağıdikencik, Çarşamba
 Aşağıdonurlu, Çarşamba
 Aşağıesenli, Çarşamba
 Aşağıkavacık, Çarşamba
 Aşağımusalla, Çarşamba
 Aşağıturgutlu, Çarşamba
 Aşıklı, Çarşamba
 Ataköy, Çarşamba
 Bafracalı, Çarşamba
 Bayramlı, Çarşamba
 Beylerce, Çarşamba
 Beyyenice, Çarşamba
 Bezirgan, Çarşamba
 Boyacılı, Çarşamba
 Bölmeçayırı, Çarşamba
 Canlı, Çarşamba
 Cumhuriyet, Çarşamba
 Çaltı, Çarşamba
 Çatak, Çarşamba
 Çayvar, Çarşamba
 Çelikli, Çarşamba
 Çerçiler, Çarşamba
 Çınarlık, Çarşamba
 Dalbahçe, Çarşamba
 Damlataş, Çarşamba
 Demirarslan, Çarşamba
 Demircili, Çarşamba
 Demirli, Çarşamba
 Denizler, Çarşamba
 Deyincek, Çarşamba
 Dikbıyık, Çarşamba
 Durakbaşı, Çarşamba
 Durusu, Çarşamba
 Eğridere, Çarşamba
 Eğrikum, Çarşamba
 Epçeli, Çarşamba
 Esençay, Çarşamba
 Esentepe, Çarşamba
 Gökçeçakmak, Çarşamba
 Gökçeli, Çarşamba
 Güldere, Çarşamba
 Gülören, Çarşamba
 Gülyazı, Çarşamba
 Güneşli, Çarşamba
 Hacılıçay, Çarşamba
 Helvacalı, Çarşamba
 Hürriyet, Çarşamba
 Irmaksırtı, Çarşamba
 Kabaceviz, Çarşamba
 Karaağaç, Çarşamba
 Karabahçe, Çarşamba
 Karacalı, Çarşamba
 Karakaya, Çarşamba
 Karakulak, Çarşamba
 Karamustafalı, Çarşamba
 Kaydan, Çarşamba
 Kemer, Çarşamba
 Kestanepınarı, Çarşamba
 Kızılot, Çarşamba
 Kirazbucağı, Çarşamba
 Kocakavak, Çarşamba
 Koldere, Çarşamba
 Konukluk, Çarşamba
 Köklük, Çarşamba
 Köroğlu, Çarşamba
 Kumarlı, Çarşamba
 Kumköy, Çarşamba
 Kumtepe, Çarşamba
 Kurtahmetli, Çarşamba
 Kuşçulu, Çarşamba
 Kuşhane, Çarşamba
 Kürtün, Çarşamba
 Mahmutlu, Çarşamba
 Melik, Çarşamba
 Musçalı, Çarşamba
 Namazlı, Çarşamba
 Ordubaşı, Çarşamba
 Orduköy, Çarşamba
 Otluk, Çarşamba
 Ovacık, Çarşamba
 Oymalı, Çarşamba
 Ömerli, Çarşamba
 Paşayazı, Çarşamba
 Porsuk, Çarşamba
 Sahilköy, Çarşamba
 Saraçlı, Çarşamba
 Sefalı, Çarşamba
 Selimiye, Çarşamba
 Sığırtmaç, Çarşamba
 Soğucak, Çarşamba
 Suğluca, Çarşamba
 Şenyurt, Çarşamba
 Şeyhgüven, Çarşamba
 Şeyhhabil, Çarşamba
 Taşdemir, Çarşamba
 Tatarlı, Çarşamba
 Tilkili, Çarşamba
 Turgutlu, Çarşamba
 Uluköy, Çarşamba
 Ulupınar, Çarşamba
 Ustacalı, Çarşamba
 Uzunlu, Çarşamba
 Vakıfköprü, Çarşamba
 Yağcılar, Çarşamba
 Yamanlı, Çarşamba
 Yenikaracalı, Çarşamba
 Yenikışla, Çarşamba
 Yeniköseli, Çarşamba
 Yeşilova, Çarşamba
 Yukarıdikencik, Çarşamba
 Yukarıdonurlu, Çarşamba
 Yukarıesenli, Çarşamba
 Yukarıkarabahçe, Çarşamba
 Yukarıkavacık, Çarşamba
 Zümrüt, Çarşamba

Havza
Havza
 Ağcamahmut, Havza
 Ağdırhasan, Havza
 Arslançayırı, Havza
 Aşağı Yavucak, Havza
 Aşağısusuz, Havza
 Başpelit, Havza
 Bekdiğin, Havza
 Belalan, Havza
 Beyköy, Havza
 Beyören, Havza
 Boyalı, Havza
 Celil, Havza
 Cevizlik, Havza
 Çakıralan, Havza
 Çamyatağı, Havza
 Çayırözü, Havza
 Çelikalan, Havza
 Çeltek, Havza
 Çiftlikköy, Havza
 Demiryurt, Havza
 Dereköy, Havza
 Doğançayır, Havza
 Dündarlı, Havza
 Ekinpınarı, Havza
 Elmacık, Havza
 Ereli, Havza
 Erikbelen, Havza
 Ersandık, Havza
 Esenbey, Havza
 Eymir, Havza
 Gelincik, Havza
 Gidirli, Havza
 Güvercinlik, Havza
 Hacıbattal, Havza
 Hacıdede, Havza
 Hecinli, Havza
 Hilmiye, Havza
 Ilıca, Havza
 İmircik, Havza
 Kaleköy, Havza
 Kamlık, Havza
 Karabük, Havza
 Karageçmiş, Havza
 Karahalil, Havza
 Karameşe, Havza
 Karga, Havza
 Kayabaşı, Havza
 Kayacık, Havza
 Kemaliye, Havza
 Kıroğlu, Havza
 Kirenlik, Havza
 Kocaoğlu, Havza
 Kocapınar, Havza
 Kuşkonağı, Havza
 Küflek, Havza
 Meryemdere, Havza
 Mesudiye, Havza
 Mısmılağaç, Havza
 Mürsel, Havza
 Orhaniye, Havza
 Ortaklar, Havza
 Paşapınarı, Havza
 Pınarçay, Havza
 Sivrikese, Havza
 Sofular, Havza
 Şerifali, Havza
 Şeyhali, Havza
 Şeyhkoyun, Havza
 Şeyhler, Havza
 Şeyhsafi, Havza
 Taşkaracaören, Havza
 Tekkeköy, Havza
 Tuzla, Havza
 Uluçal, Havza
 Yağcımahmut, Havza
 Yaylaçatı, Havza
 Yazıkışla, Havza
 Yenice, Havza
 Yeşilalan, Havza
 Yukarısusuz, Havza
 Yukarıyavucak, Havza

Kavak
 Kavak
 Ağcakese, Kavak
 Ahırlı, Kavak
 Akbelen, Kavak
 Alaçam, Kavak
 Alaçamderesi, Kavak
 Alagömlek, Kavak
 Aşağıçirişli, Kavak
 Atayurt, Kavak
 Ayvalı, Kavak
 Azaklı, Kavak
 Başalan, Kavak
 Bayındır, Kavak
 Bayraklı, Kavak
 Bekdemir, Kavak
 Belalan, Kavak
 Beybesli, Kavak
 Beyköy, Kavak
 Boğaziçi, Kavak
 Bükceğiz, Kavak
 Büyükçukur, Kavak
 Celallı, Kavak
 Çakallı, Kavak
 Çalbaşı, Kavak
 Çarıklıbaşı, Kavak
 Çataltepe, Kavak
 Çayırlı, Kavak
 Çiçekyazı, Kavak
 Çiğdem, Kavak
 Çivril, Kavak
 Çukurbük, Kavak
 Değirmencili, Kavak
 Demirci, Kavak
 Dereköy, Kavak
 Divanbaşı, Kavak
 Doruk, Kavak
 Duman, Kavak
 Dura, Kavak
 Emirli, Kavak
 Germiyan, Kavak
 Göçebe, Kavak
 Güneyce, Kavak
 Hacılı, Kavak
 Ilıcaköy, Kavak
 İdrisli, Kavak
 İkizdere, Kavak
 Kapıhayat, Kavak
 Karacaaslan, Kavak
 Karacalar, Kavak
 Karadağ, Kavak
 Karantı, Kavak
 Karapınar, Kavak
 Karayusuflu, Kavak
 Karga, Kavak
 Karlı, Kavak
 Kayabaşı, Kavak
 Kayaköy, Kavak
 Kazancı, Kavak
 Kethuda, Kavak
 Kozansıkı, Kavak
 Köseli, Kavak
 Kurşunlu, Kavak
 Kuzalan, Kavak
 Küçükçukur, Kavak
 Mahmutbeyli, Kavak
 Mahmutlu, Kavak
 Mert, Kavak
 Muhsinli, Kavak
 Muratbeyli, Kavak
 Ortaköy, Kavak
 Saraykent, Kavak
 Sarıalan, Kavak
 Seyitali, Kavak
 Sıralı, Kavak
 Susuz, Kavak
 Şeyhli, Kavak
 Şeyhresul, Kavak
 Tabaklı, Kavak
 Talışman, Kavak
 Tatarmuslu, Kavak
 Tekkeköy, Kavak
 Tepecik, Kavak
 Toptepe, Kavak
 Üçhanlar, Kavak
 Yenigün, Kavak
 Yeralan, Kavak
 Yukarıçirişli, Kavak

Ladik
 Ladik
 Ağcakaya, Ladik
 Ahmetsaray, Ladik
 Aktaş, Ladik
 Akyar, Ladik
 Alayurt, Ladik
 Alıçlı, Ladik
 Arslantaş, Ladik
 Aşağıgölyazı, Ladik
 Ayvalı, Ladik
 Ayvalısokağı, Ladik
 Başlamış, Ladik
 Budakdere, Ladik
 Büyükalan, Ladik
 Büyükkızoğlu, Ladik
 Cüce, Ladik
 Çadırkaya, Ladik
 Çakırgümüş, Ladik
 Çamlıköy, Ladik
 Daldere, Ladik
 Deliahmetoğlu, Ladik
 Derinöz, Ladik
 Doğankaş, Ladik
 Eynekaraca, Ladik
 Günkoru, Ladik
 Gürün, Ladik
 Güvenli, Ladik
 Hamamayağı, Ladik
 Hamitköy, Ladik
 Hasırcı, Ladik
 Hızarbaşı, Ladik
 İbi, Ladik
 İsasofta, Ladik
 Kabacagöz, Ladik
 Karaabdal, Ladik
 Kıranboğaz, Ladik
 Kirazpınar, Ladik
 Köseoğlu, Ladik
 Kuyucak, Ladik
 Küçükkızoğlu, Ladik
 Küpecik, Ladik
 Mazlumoğlu, Ladik
 Meşepınarı, Ladik
 Nusretli, Ladik
 Oymapınar, Ladik
 Polat, Ladik
 Salur, Ladik
 Sarıgazel, Ladik
 Sarıksızoğlu, Ladik
 Soğanlı, Ladik
 Söğütlü, Ladik
 Şeyhli, Ladik
 Tatlıcak, Ladik
 Teberoğlu, Ladik
 Yukarıgölyazı, Ladik
 Yumaklı, Ladik
 Yuvacık, Ladik

Ondokuzmayıs
 Ondokuzmayıs
 Aydınpınar, Ondokuzmayıs
 Beylik, Ondokuzmayıs
 Cerekli, Ondokuzmayıs
 Çandır, Ondokuzmayıs
 Çepinler, Ondokuzmayıs
 Çetirlipınar, Ondokuzmayıs
 Çiftlikköy, Ondokuzmayıs
 Dağköy, Ondokuzmayıs
 Dereköy, Ondokuzmayıs
 Düzköy, Ondokuzmayıs
 Esentepe, Ondokuzmayıs
 Fındıklı, Ondokuzmayıs
 Hibe, Ondokuzmayıs
 Karacaoğlu, Ondokuzmayıs
 Karagöl, Ondokuzmayıs
 Kertme, Ondokuzmayıs
 Kösedik, Ondokuzmayıs
 Kuşyakası, Ondokuzmayıs
 Ormancık, Ondokuzmayıs
 Tepeköy, Ondokuzmayıs
 Yeşilköy, Ondokuzmayıs
 Yeşilyurt, Ondokuzmayıs
 Yörükler, Ondokuzmayıs

Terme
 Terme
 Ahmetbey, Terme
 Akbucak, Terme
 Akçagün, Terme
 Akçay, Terme
 Akçaykaracalı, Terme
 Altunlu, Terme
 Ambartepe, Terme
 Aybeder, Terme
 Bafracalı, Terme
 Bağsaray, Terme
 Bazlamaç, Terme
 Beşikli, Terme
 Çamlıca, Terme
 Çanaklı, Terme
 Çangallar, Terme
 Çardak, Terme
 Dağdıralı, Terme
 Dereyol, Terme
 Dibekli, Terme
 Dumantepe, Terme
 Elmaköy, Terme
 Emiryusuf, Terme
 Erenköy, Terme
 Etyemezli, Terme
 Evci, Terme
 Eyercili, Terme
 Geçmiş, Terme
 Gölyazı, Terme
 Gündoğdu, Terme
 Hüseyinmescit, Terme
 İmanalisi, Terme
 Karacaköy, Terme
 Karacalı, Terme
 Karamahmut, Terme
 Karkucak, Terme
 Kazımkarabekirpaşa, Terme
 Kesikkaya, Terme
 Kocaman, Terme
 Kocamanbaşı, Terme
 Kozluk, Terme
 Köybucağı, Terme
 Kumcığaz, Terme
 Kuşculu, Terme
 Kuşça, Terme
 Mescitköy, Terme
 Meşeyazı, Terme
 Muratlı, Terme
 Oğuzlu, Terme
 Ortasöğütlü, Terme
 Örencik, Terme
 Özyurt, Terme
 Sakarlı, Terme
 Sancaklı, Terme
 Sarayköy, Terme
 Sivaslılar, Terme
 Söğütlü, Terme
 Sütözü, Terme
 Şeyhli, Terme
 Şuayip, Terme
 Taşlık, Terme
 Taşpınar, Terme
 Uludere, Terme
 Uzungazi, Terme
 Yenicami, Terme
 Yerli, Terme
 Yukarıtaşpınar, Terme
 Yüksekyayla, Terme

Salıpazarı
 Salıpazarı
 Alan, Salıpazarı
 Avut, Salıpazarı
 Biçme, Salıpazarı
 Cevizli, Salıpazarı
 Çağlayan, Salıpazarı
 Çiçekli, Salıpazarı
 Dikencik, Salıpazarı
 Esatçiftliği, Salıpazarı
 Fatsalılar, Salıpazarı
 Fındıklı, Salıpazarı
 Fidancık, Salıpazarı
 Gökçebaşı, Salıpazarı
 Güzelvatan, Salıpazarı
 Kalfalı, Salıpazarı
 Karacaören, Salıpazarı
 Karadere, Salıpazarı
 Karaman, Salıpazarı
 Karayonca, Salıpazarı
 Kırgıl, Salıpazarı
 Kızılot, Salıpazarı
 Kocalar, Salıpazarı
 Konakören, Salıpazarı
 Kuşcuğaz, Salıpazarı
 Muslubey, Salıpazarı
 Suluca, Salıpazarı
 Tacalan, Salıpazarı
 Tahnal, Salıpazarı
 Tepealtı, Salıpazarı
 Yavaşbey, Salıpazarı
 Yayla, Salıpazarı
 Yenidoğan, Salıpazarı
 Yeşil, Salıpazarı
 Yukarıkestanepınarı, Salıpazarı

Vezirköprü
 Vezirköprü
 Adatepe, Vezirköprü
 Ağcaalan, Vezirköprü
 Ağcayazı, Vezirköprü
 Ahmetbaba, Vezirköprü
 Akören, Vezirköprü
 Alan, Vezirköprü
 Alanbaşı, Vezirköprü
 Alancık, Vezirköprü
 Alanşeyhi, Vezirköprü
 Altınkaya, Vezirköprü
 Arıca, Vezirköprü
 Avdan, Vezirköprü
 Aydınlı, Vezirköprü
 Aydoğdu, Vezirköprü
 Ayvalı, Vezirköprü
 Bahçekonak, Vezirköprü
 Bahçesaray, Vezirköprü
 Bakla, Vezirköprü
 Başalan, Vezirköprü
 Başfakı, Vezirköprü
 Bayram, Vezirköprü
 Bektaş, Vezirköprü
 Belalan, Vezirköprü
 Beşpınar, Vezirköprü
 Boğa, Vezirköprü
 Boğazkoru, Vezirköprü
 Boruk, Vezirköprü
 Burhaniye, Vezirköprü
 Büyükkale, Vezirköprü
 Cebeli, Vezirköprü
 Çakırtaş, Vezirköprü
 Çal, Vezirköprü
 Çalman, Vezirköprü
 Çaltu, Vezirköprü
 Çamlıca, Vezirköprü
 Çamlıkonak, Vezirköprü
 Çekalan, Vezirköprü
 Çekmeden, Vezirköprü
 Çeltek, Vezirköprü
 Çorakdere, Vezirköprü
 Danabaş, Vezirköprü
 Darıçay, Vezirköprü
 Darıçayalanı, Vezirköprü
 Devalan, Vezirköprü
 Doyran, Vezirköprü
 Duruçay, Vezirköprü
 Elaldı, Vezirköprü
 Elbeyi, Vezirköprü
 Elmalı, Vezirköprü
 Esen, Vezirköprü
 Esentepe, Vezirköprü
 Esenyurt, Vezirköprü
 Göl, Vezirköprü
 Göllüalan, Vezirköprü
 Gömlekhisar, Vezirköprü
 Güder, Vezirköprü
 Güldere, Vezirköprü
 Habipkakı, Vezirköprü
 Hacılı, Vezirköprü
 Halilbaba, Vezirköprü
 Halkahavlı, Vezirköprü
 Hayranlı, Vezirköprü
 İmircik, Vezirköprü
 İncesu, Vezirköprü
 İnkaya, Vezirköprü
 Kabalı, Vezirköprü
 Kadıçayırı, Vezirköprü
 Kadıoğlu, Vezirköprü
 Kapaklı, Vezirköprü
 Kapaklıçeşme, Vezirköprü
 Kaplancık, Vezirköprü
 Karabük, Vezirköprü
 Karacaören, Vezirköprü
 Karadoruk, Vezirköprü
 Karaköy, Vezirköprü
 Karanar, Vezirköprü
 Karapınar, Vezirköprü
 Karkucak, Vezirköprü
 Karlı, Vezirköprü
 Kavakpınarı, Vezirköprü
 Kılıçgüney, Vezirköprü
 Kıranalan, Vezirköprü
 Kıratbükü, Vezirköprü
 Kırma, Vezirköprü
 Kızılcakoru, Vezirköprü
 Kızılcaören, Vezirköprü
 Kızılkese, Vezirköprü
 Kocakaya, Vezirköprü
 Kovalı, Vezirköprü
 Köprübaşı, Vezirköprü
 Kumral, Vezirköprü
 Kuruçay, Vezirköprü
 Kuşçular, Vezirköprü
 Kuyaş, Vezirköprü
 Kuyumcular, Vezirköprü
 Küçükkale, Vezirköprü
 Kületek, Vezirköprü
 Mahmatlı, Vezirköprü
 Melikli, Vezirköprü
 Meşeli, Vezirköprü
 Mezraa, Vezirköprü
 Narlısaray, Vezirköprü
 Orta, Vezirköprü
 Oruç, Vezirköprü
 Ovacık, Vezirköprü
 Oymaağaç, Vezirköprü
 Öğürlü, Vezirköprü
 Örencik, Vezirköprü
 Özyörük, Vezirköprü
 Paşa, Vezirköprü
 Pazarcı, Vezirköprü
 Samukalan, Vezirköprü
 Samur, Vezirköprü
 Saraycık, Vezirköprü
 Sarıalan, Vezirköprü
 Sarıdibek, Vezirköprü
 Sarıyar, Vezirköprü
 Sırbaşmak, Vezirköprü
 Sofular, Vezirköprü
 Soğucak, Vezirköprü
 Susuz, Vezirköprü
 Şentepe, Vezirköprü
 Tahtaköprü, Vezirköprü
 Taşlıyük, Vezirköprü
 Tatarkale, Vezirköprü
 Teberük, Vezirköprü
 Tekkekıran, Vezirköprü
 Tepeören, Vezirköprü
 Türkmen, Vezirköprü
 Yağcı, Vezirköprü
 Yağınözü, Vezirköprü
 Yarbaşı, Vezirköprü
 Yeniçelik, Vezirköprü
 Yenidüzce, Vezirköprü
 Yeşiltepe, Vezirköprü
 Yolpınar, Vezirköprü
 Yukarınarlı, Vezirköprü
 Yurtdağı, Vezirköprü
 Yürükçal, Vezirköprü

Yalakent
 Yakakent
 Asmapınar, Yakakent
 Büyükkırık, Yakakent
 Çamalan, Yakakent
 Çepni, Yakakent
 Gündüzlü, Yakakent
 Karaaba, Yakakent
 Kayalı, Yakakent
 Kuzören, Yakakent
 Küplüağzı, Yakakent
 Mutaflı, Yakakent
 Sarıgöl, Yakakent
 Yeşilköy, Yakakent
 Yassıdağ, Yakakent

References

List
Samsun